FC Vilniaus Vytis was a Lithuanian football team from the city of Vilnius.

History 
Founded as FK TAIP in 2012. Played in amateur leagues. Was promoted to I Lyga. In 2016 changed name to Vilniaus Vytis. Few seasons was one of the strongest teams in I Lyga. In 2021 Vilniaus Vytis withdrew from 1 Lyga for one season with an option to rejoin for season 2022.

Recent seasons

FK TAIP

"Vilniaus Vytis"

Current squad 
As of 24 January 2020.

References

External links 
 FK Vilniaus Vytis in I Lyga Website
 FC Vilniaus Vytis Soccerway

Defunct football clubs in Lithuania
Football clubs in Vilnius
Sport in Vilnius
2007 establishments in Lithuania
2021 disestablishments in Lithuania
Association football clubs established in 2007
Association football clubs disestablished in 2021